St. Joan of Arc Catholic High School (also referred to as SJA) is a high school in Maple, Ontario, Canada, located in the city of Vaughan. It is administered by the York Catholic District School Board. Its student population is primarily composed of residents of Maple and other parts of northeastern Vaughan.

Feeder schools
The "feeder" elementary schools are as follows:
 Holy Jubilee Catholic Elementary School
 Saint David's Catholic Elementary School
 Divine Mercy Catholic Elementary School
 Father John Kelly Catholic Elementary School
 Blessed Trinity Catholic Elementary School
 St. James Catholic Elementary School
 St. Raphael the Archangel Catholic Elementary School
 St. Cecilia Catholic Elementary School

Sports

The sports that the school participates in are as follows:

Baseball
Basketball
Badminton
Hockey
Rugby
Cross country
Volleyball
Soccer
Swimming
Slo-pitch
Ultimate Frisbee
Table tennis
Tennis
Golf
Wrestling
Track and field
Cheerleading

Clubs/Committees

The clubs and committees that the school has are as follows:
 Athletic Council: TIC TAC
 Taste of Joan Committee
 Music Council
 Student Council: SAC
 Band
 Dance Team
 Awareness of Culture Equity: ACE
 Arts Council: ARC
 Ontario Students Against Impaired Driving: OSAID
 Chaplaincy
 Drama Club
 Chess Club
 Student's for Change
 Mock Trial
 Weight Room/ Fitness Club
 Joan Journal
 Yearbook
 White Pine Reading
 Vow of Silence
 Think Fast
 Newspaper
 Model United Nations
Choir

Events

 Terry Fox Run
 Taste of Joan
 Joan Unplugged
 Joan Jingle Jam
 Arts Night
 New York Trip
 Iron Chef
 Music Night
 Summer Carnival
 Winterlicious
 Drama Productions
 Friday Night Lights
 Awards Night

Community Involvement

The school community is well known in York Region for its generosity/helping to raise funds for a variety of charitable causes. The most significant charitable cause since the school opened has been the Terry Fox Foundation. Members of the school community have raised over a quarter of a million dollars for cancer research since the school opened.

Alumni
Massimo Bertocchi, decathlete who competed in the 2008 Beijing Olympics placing 19th.
Melanie Fiona, a musician who has won two Grammy Awards
Ashley Moreira, international soccer player who played for the Pittsburgh Panthers.

See also
List of high schools in Ontario

References

External links
St. Joan of Arc Catholic High School

York Catholic District School Board
Education in Vaughan
Educational institutions established in 1993
1993 establishments in Ontario
High schools in the Regional Municipality of York